The following is a list of awards and nominations received by American actress Laurie Metcalf throughout her career. She is known for her performances on the stage and screen.

Metcalf received an Academy Award for Best Supporting Actress nomination for her performance in Greta Gerwig's coming of age film Lady Bird (2017). Her other film work includes Susan Seidelman's Desperately Seeking Susan (1985), John Hughes' comedy Uncle Buck (1989), and Oliver Stone's JFK (1991). She is also known for voicing Mrs. Davis in the acclaimed Toy Story film series. She is also widely known for her television roles, including Jackie Harris on the long running ABC sitcom series Roseanne (1988-1997; 2018) and Dr. Jenna James in HBO's Getting On (2013-2015), in addition to  her guest roles on shows such as 3rd Rock from the Sun, Monk, The Big Bang Theory and Louis C.K.'s tragicomedy series Horace and Pete (2016). She has received eleven Primetime Emmy Award nominations winning three consecutive awards for her performance in Roseanne. She is also highly regarded for her work on the stage, including Broadway, receiving eight Tony Awards winning two for her performances in Lucas Hnath's A Doll's House, Part 2 (2017), and the revival of Edward Albee's Three Tall Women (2018). She is a founding member of the Steppenwolf Theater Company.

Major associations

Academy Awards

British Academy Film Awards

Golden Globe Awards

Primetime Emmy Awards

Screen Actors Guild Awards

Tony Awards

Industry awards

Independent Spirit Awards

Satellite Awards

Theater awards

Drama Desk Awards

Outer Critics Circle Awards

Drama League Awards

Lucille Lortel Awards

Critics awards

Critics' Choice Movie Awards

Critics' Choice Television Awards

Other critics awards

References 

Metcalf, Laurie